The Noggle Cemetery is a family cemetery founded in the late 19th century in Cass Township, Pulaski County, Indiana. This located on is private property.

History 
It is about 2 miles northeast of Medaryville. The cemetery sits on land that was originally conveyed by patent to Richard Noggle, a pioneer settler of Cass Township, on August 1, 1844. It is legally described as being "a square of 8 rods on a side" in Section 31 of Twp. 31 N, R 4 W, 2nd P.M. A  rod is equal to 16.5 feet.  (An acre was originally defined as being an area one chain by one furlong.  A chain is 4 rods, and a furlong is ten chains, so an acre is thus 66' x 660'.) 

Four years later a nearby tract was patented to Isaac Noggle. How the two men are related is a matter of some question. One online source shows Isaac, who was born in 1775, as the son of Richard and Mary ( Hamilton) Noggle. This is unlikely, however, as the latter couple weren't married until 1847 (in Logansport), at which point their "son" would have been 74 years old. It is more likely that Richard (who was born ca 1801) was Isaac's son or nephew. Richard had a son named Isaac, who died in infancy in 1853 and was one of the early burials in the cemetery. Three Noggles are buried there: Richard, who died in 1859, his infant son Isaac, and the older Isaac.  (The dates on the grave of the older Isaac don't jibe with his having been born in 1775, which fact is verified by an 1850 census showing him in Cass at age 75.)

The Noggles came to the area as part of a number of settlers who had been born in the East, but who all settled for a time in Champaign County, Ohio. Isaac Noggle's sister Mary Elizabeth was married to Nicholas Swisher.  Both Nicholas Swisher and his son James N. had large families, from whom many noted citizens on the west side of Pulaski county are descended.  Other settlers who came from Champaign County included Benjamin Archer (who married Nicholas Swisher's daughter Susannah), Michael Hess, and George Poisel.

In 1884, Richard Noggle's son Abraham deeded the land to three trustees, for a "perpetual cemetery:" Aaron Archer, Silas Long, and William Cox.  Cox's wife Sophia and Long were grandchildren of Silas Phillips, the first settler in Pulaski County whose farm was just east of Medaryville.  Aaron Archer was Benjamin's son, and thus of Noggle descendant.

In the early part of the 20th century the cemetery seems to have been abandoned. In 1971 Zera Howe, Medaryville's indefatigable historian, visited Noggle and described it thus:  "It is in deplorable condition, having been damaged by cattle and ground hogs. Supposedly there are 30-35 graves there. I was able to read 12, and no doubt the other markers are lying, broken, under the ground."

Notable local residents buried there are Benjamin and Susannah ( Swisher) Archer, Henry and Sally ( Phillips) Long's infant son George, and Peter Shultz.  Shultz was a son of Joseph Bennett Shultz, who built the first house in Medaryville which is now the Evert House hotel.  He married Henry and Sally Long's daughter Amanda.

Access to the cemetery currently must be gained by crossing two parcels of private property.

References
 Goodspeed, Weston A. "Pulaski County", in "Counties of White and Pulaski", F. A. Battey and Co., Chicago, 1883
 Howe, Zera "Pulaski County, Indiana Cemetery Inscriptions, with Historical and Genealogical Notes, White Post and Cass Townships, Book One", Pulaski County Historical Society, Winamac, IN, 1975
 Deed records, Pulaski County Indiana, Record Book 41, p 39
 Deed records, Pulaski County Indiana, Record Book 41, p 130
 Census Record, Cass Township, Pulaski County Indiana, 1850, p. 1
 U.S. General Land Office Records, Winamac, Indiana, Document 14024
 U.S. General Land Office Records, Winamac, Indiana, Document 15063

Cemeteries in Indiana
Protected areas of Pulaski County, Indiana